A by-election was held in Kaski 2 constituency of Nepal on 30 November 2019, following the death of incumbent Rabindra Prasad Adhikari in a helicopter crash. Adhikari was a 3-term Member of Parliament from Kaski. He was the Minister of Culture, Tourism and Civil Aviation at the time of his death. The by-election was won by Bidya Bhattarai, his widow, with 54.27% of the vote. She defeated her nearest rival, Khem Raj Paudel of Nepali Congress, by 8,403 votes.

Candidates
A total of 21 candidates took part in the election. Nepal Communist Party (NCP) selected Bidya Bhattarai, widow of Rabindra Prasad Adhikari, as their candidate. Her primary opponent was Khem Raj Paudel of Nepali Congress.

Result

References

By-elections in Nepal
2019 in Nepal